Monark 606 is a  sailboat class designed by Pelle Petterson and built in about 800 copies.

It is a small type of lightweight racing keelboat and has an excellent combination of stability and key characteristics of the dinghy.  For example, it is very easy to plane and increase speed drastically due to an excellent design, a flat bottom, a high-performance sail area, and a high power-to-weight ratio.

The 606 has a large cockpit relative to its size and allows for moving about easily, with the rudder positioned on the transom. It offers numerous opportunities for trimming, combined with liberal rules for its class, and is well-suited for coastal cruising and competitive racing.

Combined, these capabilities allow for a sporty and versatile boat that especially in Scandinavia appeals to enthusiasts. National championships are regularly held in Scandinavia and Finland.

See also
Monark 540
Monark 806

References

1970s sailboat type designs
Sailboat type designs by Swedish designers
Keelboats
Sailing yachts designed by Pelle Pettersson